Olivia Rossetti Agresti (1875–1960) was a British activist, author, editor, and interpreter. A member of one of England's most prominent artistic and literary families, her unconventional political trajectory began with anarchism, continued with the League of Nations, and ended with Italian Fascism. Her involvement with the latter led to an important correspondence and friendship with Ezra Pound, who mentions her twice in his Cantos.

While still in their girlhood, Olivia and her sister, the future Helen Rossetti Angeli (1879-1969), began publishing an anarchist journal, The Torch. Years later, using the pseudonym "Isabel Meredith", Olivia and Helen published A Girl Among the Anarchists, a somewhat fictionalized memoir of their days as precocious child revolutionaries.

Selected works 
1903. A Girl Among the Anarchists (co-authored with her sister Helen under the pseudonym "Isabel Meredith"). London: Duckworth Press.edition Internet Archive
1904. Giovanni Costa: His Life, Work, and Times. London: Grant Richards.
1920. "LEAGUE OF AGRICULTURE; How Institute David Lubin Founded Will Supplement Greater League of Nations", New York Times, 23 May, Page XX16
1922. David Lubin: A Study in Practical Idealism. Boston: Little, Brown and Company. 2nd edition, Berkeley and Los Angeles: University of California Press, 1941.
1938. The Organization of the Arts and Professions in the Fascist Guild State (co-authored with Mario Missiroli). Rome: Laboremus

Notes

References

External links 

 Olivia Rossetti Agresti Papers. Yale Collection of American Literature, Beinecke Rare Book and Manuscript Library.

 

1875 births
1960 deaths
English fascists
English people of Italian descent
People from London
English anarchists
Italian fascists
Ezra Pound
People associated with the Pre-Raphaelite Brotherhood
Polidori-Rossetti family